Wythenshawe Bus Garage is a Grade II* listed building in Wythenshawe, Greater Manchester, England.

Designed by Manchester City Architects Department under G. Noel Hill, and completed in 1942, the garage was a pioneering example of its type of construction. It is located in Harling Road, off Sharston Road in the Sharston district of Wythenshawe. It was the second-largest reinforced concrete shell roof structure to be constructed in England. The building’s structure was particularly innovative for its time. Its concrete arches have a span of 165 ft (50.3m) from side to side, are 42 ft (12.8m) high and spaced 42 ft (12.8m) apart. The tensile concrete shell roof between these concrete arches is just 2.5 inches (63.5mm) thick and is daringly punctured by large rooflights. Wythenshawe Garage proved to be the model for much larger buildings using the concrete shell roof structure technique, which was an economic method of achieving large uninterrupted roof spans.

Originally designed to garage 100 double-decker buses, the building on its completion was immediately commandeered by the Ministry of Aircraft Production for work associated with the building and repair of Avro Lancaster bombers in support of Britain’s Second World War efforts.

On its return to Manchester Corporation use in 1946, the building was known as Northenden garage. It housed buses used mainly on routes linking the city centre and the large Wythenshawe housing estate, also on three serving Gatley and Styal, the Sale Moor and Brooklands districts of Sale, and Baguley and the Timperley district of Altrincham.

The building is now in private ownership and is used for car parking.

See also

Grade II* listed buildings in Greater Manchester
Listed buildings in Manchester-M22

References 
Notes

Bibliography

Further reading 
"Manchester Bus Garage" in Concrete Quarterly, No. 1, July 1947, pp. 44–47.

Grade II* listed buildings in Manchester
Wythenshawe
Buildings and structures completed in 1942